Robert Makara ); born January 27, 1948) was a Soviet nordic combined skier who competed in the late 1960s. At the 1968 Winter Olympics in Grenoble, he finished seventh in the Nordic combined event.

External links
Nordic combined Olympic results: 1968-84

1948 births
Nordic combined skiers at the 1968 Winter Olympics
Russian male Nordic combined skiers
Soviet male Nordic combined skiers
Living people
Olympic Nordic combined skiers of the Soviet Union